Battier is a French surname.  Notable people with the name include:

Henrietta Battier (c. 1751–1813), Irish poet, satirist, and actress
Marc Battier (born 1947), French composer and musicologist
Shane Battier (born 1978), American retired basketball player

French-language surnames